The Triangular Football League or New England Intercollegiate Football Association was an American college football conference. Its founding members were Dartmouth, Williams, and Amherst. The Triangular Football League was formed in 1892, and was a successor organization to the Eastern Intercollegiate Football Association (1887–1891) and the Northern Intercollegiate Football Association (1885–1886). MIT had been a member of the previous iterations as late as 1887, and Wesleyan became a member of the Triangular Football League by at least 1899.

Football champions

 1885 – 
 1886 – Williams
 1887 – 
 1888 – Dartmouth and 
 1889 – Dartmouth
 1890 – 
 1891 – 
 1892 – Amherst
 1893 – Dartmouth

 1894 – Dartmouth
 1895 – Dartmouth
 1896 – Dartmouth
 1897 – Dartmouth
 1898 – Dartmouth
 1899 – 
 1900 – 
 1901 –

See also
 List of Triangular Football League standings
 List of defunct college football conferences
 New England Small College Athletic Conference

References